Honduras–Mexico relations are the diplomatic relations between Honduras and Mexico. Both nations are members of the Association of Caribbean States, Community of Latin American and Caribbean States, Organization of American States,  Organization of Ibero-American States and the United Nations.

History 
Honduras and Mexico have always had a close relationship and also share a history and several socio-cultural traits in common. Both nations have national heritages of Mesoamerican cultures such as the Maya, both were conquered by the same conquerors such as Hernán Cortes, Cristóbal de Olid, and Pedro de Alvarado and subsequently belonged to the Spanish Empire, both are mostly Catholic, and both nations were part of the Viceroyalty of New Spain from 1535 to 1821. Shortly after achieving Independence from Spain in 1821, Honduras was a part of the First Mexican Empire for a very short time until 1823 when it then joined the Federal Republic of Central America. Among the Mexicans who joined the Army Allied Protector of the Law, commanded by the Honduran Francisco Morazán during the so-called Central American Civil Wars, were General Agustín Guzmán, a native of Quetzaltenango and many others. After its dissolution in 1838, Honduras became an independent nation.

Honduras and Mexico established formal diplomatic relations in 1879 during the terms of Dr. Marco Aurelio Soto in Honduras and Don Porfirio Díaz in Mexico.In 1908, both nations established resident diplomatic missions in each other's capitals, respectively. That same year, a treaty of 'Friendship, Commerce and Navigation' was signed between both nations. In 1943, their diplomatic missions were elevated to embassies.

During the 19th century, after the Honduran liberal reform and the modification of the immigration laws issued by the Honduran government, many Mexicans undertook the journey to the south, until they reached Honduras and settled in the cities of Tegucigalpa, San Pedro Sula, La Ceiba, and among other places and thus settle down to found their companies or search for better opportunities.

Mexico has actively observed and become involved in Honduran affairs throughout the country's early turbulent history which involved coup d'état, military rule, US intervention and wars with neighboring countries. In 1969, Honduras went to war with El Salvador known as the Football War for which Mexico intervened diplomatically and tried to resolve between the two countries. In June 2009, Honduran President Manuel Zelaya was ousted in a coup d'état and taken to neighboring Costa Rica. Like several other Latin American nations, Mexico temporarily severed diplomatic relations with Honduras. In July 2010, full diplomatic relations were once again re-established.

Relations in the 21st Century
For several decades, Mexico has been a transit country for thousands of Honduran migrants who enter the country on their way to the United States. Many Honduran migrants flee to the United States for better economic opportunities and/or to escape rampant crime and gang violence in their country, especially from the MS-13/Mara Salvatrucha. In 2014, Mexico deported over 33,000 Honduran migrants back to Honduras.

Both the governments of Honduras and Mexico have increased mutual cooperation to provide legal and humanitarian assistance to Honduran migrants in Mexico and to combat human trafficking and violence against migrants in Mexico. Both nations have also agreed to combat the presence of Mexican cartels operating in Honduras.

In 2018, several hundreds to a few thousands Hondurans formed part of the Central American migrant caravans and traversed all of Mexico to the northern city of Tijuana to request asylum in the United States. In 2018, over 640 Hondurans requested and obtained asylum in Mexico where many are choosing to remain rather than face the uncertainty of trying to request asylum in the US and also not wishing to be denied and deported back to Honduras.

In January 2022, Mexican Foreign Minister Marcelo Ebrard paid a visit to Honduras to attend the inauguration of President Xiomara Castro. In May 2022, Mexican President Andrés Manuel López Obrador paid an official visit to Honduras.

High-level visits

Presidential visits from Honduras to Mexico
 President Oswaldo López Arellano (1965)
 President José Azcona del Hoyo (1988)
 President Rafael Leonardo Callejas Romero (1991, 1992)
 President Carlos Roberto Flores (1998)
 President Ricardo Maduro (2002, 2004)
 President Manuel Zelaya (2008, 2009)
 President Porfirio Lobo Sosa (2011, 2012)
 President Juan Orlando Hernández (2014, 2015, 2016, 2018, 2019, 2021)

Presidential visits from Mexico to Honduras

 President Carlos Salinas de Gortari (1990)
 President Vicente Fox (2004, 2006)
 President Felipe Calderón (2008)
 President Enrique Peña Nieto (2015)
 President Andrés Manuel López Obrador (2022)

Bilateral agreements
Both nations have signed several bilateral agreements such as an Agreement on Touristic Cooperation (1990); Agreement on Combating Drug Trafficking and Drug Dependency (1990); Agreement on Scientific and Technical Cooperation (1995); Agreement on Educational and Cultural Cooperation (1998); Treaty on Joint Execution of Criminal Sentences (2003); Treaty on Mutual Legal Assistance in Criminal Matters (2004) and a Treaty on Maritime Delimitation (2005).

Transportation
There are direct flights between Mexico City and San Pedro Sula with Aeroméxico Connect.

Trade relations 
In 2001, Mexico and Honduras (along with Guatemala and El Salvador) signed a free trade agreement known as the Free Trade Agreement with the Northern Triangle. In January 2013, the free trade agreement expanded to include Costa Rica and Nicaragua. In 2018, total trade between Honduras and Mexico amounted to US$1 billion. Hondura's main exports to Mexico include: automobile parts; shrimp and lobsters; cotton; lead; palm oil; coffee and textiles. Mexico's main exports to Honduras include: electronics (televisions, sound equipment and refrigerators); toys; equipment for the cement industry; leather; avocados; medicines; diapers and personal hygiene products.

Since 2012, relations have improved since the coup in Honduras in 2009, thus Mexico becomes the largest foreign investor within latin america direct in Honduras. In 2016, Mexico invested more than $138 million in Honduras. Mexican investments represent 12% of all total foreign investments in Honduras. Several Mexican multinational companies such as América Móvil, Cemex, Grupo Bimbo and Gruma (among others) operate in Honduras.

Resident diplomatic missions 
 Honduras has an embassy in Mexico City and consulates-general in Puebla, San Luis Potosí, Tapachula, Tijuana and Veracruz City and consular agencies in Acayucan, Saltillo and Tenosique.
 Mexico has an embassy in Tegucigalpa and a consulate in San Pedro Sula.

See also 
 Honduran diaspora
 Immigration to Mexico
 Mexican Drug War
 Sin Nombre (2009 film)

References 
Mexican Ministry of Foreign Affairs on bilateral relations between Mexico and Honduras (in Spanish)

 
Mexico
Bilateral relations of Mexico